Sârca may refer to several places in Romania:

Sârca, a village in Bălțați Commune, Iași County
Sârca, a village in Scorțeni Commune, Prahova County